In contemporary Japanese writing, foreign-language loanwords and foreign names are normally written in the katakana script, which is one component of the Japanese writing system. As far as possible, sounds in the source language are matched to the nearest sounds in the Japanese language, and the result is transcribed using standard katakana characters, each of which represents one syllable (strictly mora). For example, America is written アメリカ (A-me-ri-ka). To accommodate various foreign-language sounds not present in Japanese, a system of extended katakana has also developed to augment standard katakana.

Katakana, like hiragana, has a one-to-one correspondence between sounds and characters. Therefore, once the "Japanese sound" of a word is established, there is no ambiguity in its katakana spelling (unlike spelling in English, for example).

A much less common form of transcription, Ateji, uses kanji characters for their phonetic values.

Practicalities of transcription

Word length

Because Japanese is written with relatively complex Kanji characters, Japanese text must generally be written larger for legibility. Furthermore, as both Kanji and Kana are traditionally of equal width and height, Japanese characters are generally much larger than Latin characters. As Kanji are logographic and Kana encode entire syllables (or rather, morae), the higher information density of Japanese writing usually evens out with the larger text so that Japanese and English texts take about the same amount of space, but challenges arise with foreign consonant clusters incompatible with Japanese phonotactics and the Kana system. For example, the word remote control becomes the cumbersome リモートコントロール (ri-mō-to-ko-n-to-rō-ru) in Japanese. These additional sounds not only add to the word's length when spoken, but it also severely bloats the word when written. As such, the word is typically shortened to simply リモコン (ri-mo-ko-n) in modern Japanese speech and writing.

Syllable structure
Since Japanese has few closed syllables, syllable-final consonants in the source language are often represented using the -u (or sometimes -o or -i) kanas with implicitly silent vowels – though this vowel often is pronounced in Japanese – or the syllable coda is not represented at all. For example, the name Jim is written ジム (Ji-mu). A similar principle applies to consonant clusters; for example spring would be transcribed as スプリング (su-pu-ri-n-gu), and scratch would be transcribed as スクラッチ (su-ku-ra-cchi).

Diphthongs
Japanese has only five native vowel sounds, each a pure vowel (monophthong) with a long and short form, and some degree of approximation is necessary when representing vowels from, for example, English. Diphthongs are represented by sequences of vowels, and pronounced with hiatus, as a sequence of discrete monophthongs, not a diphthong, as in ブラウン Bu-ra-u-n "Brown", ナイス na-i-su "nice", ディア di-a "dear/deer", レア re-a "rare". etc. The English spelling <ore> (phonologically /ɔː/ (RP) or /ɔːr/ (GA)) is usually "diphthongized" as o-a in Japanese (e.g. コア ko-a "core"), possibly because it is also pronounced as a diphthong (/oə/) in some accents of English. The English /eɪ/ is transcribed to either e-e (エース e-e-su "ace") or e-i (スペイン Su-pe-i-n "Spain"); similarly, /əʊ/ is transcribed to either o-o (ショー sho-o "show") or o-u (シャドウ sha-do-u "shadow").

Phonemes 
Japanese does not have separate l and r sounds, and l- is normally transcribed using the kana that are perceived as representing r-. For example, London becomes ロンドン (Ro-n-do-n). Other sounds not present in Japanese may be converted to the nearest Japanese equivalent; for example, the name Smith is written スミス (Su-mi-su). Foreign sounds can be difficult to express in Japanese, resulting in spellings such as フルシチョフ Furushichofu (Khrushchev), アリー・ハーメネイー Arī Hāmeneī (Ali Khamenei) and イツハク・パールマン Itsuhaku Pāruman or イツァーク・パールマン Itsāku Pāruman (Itzhak Perlman).

The English voiceless labialized velar approximant /hw/ (orthographically wh), which is a distinct phoneme from /w/ in some varieties of English, can be transcribed as ho(w)-. For example, White is ホワイト Howaito, whale is ホエール hoēru.

French /w/ is typically transcribed as u, but the sequence /wa/ is as o-(w)a (e.g. ポアロ Po-a-ro "Poirot").

The English /ti(ː)/ and /tɪ/ is typically transcribed to チ chi (e.g. チーム chīmu "team"), but ティ ti is also used (ティア tia "tear"). The suffix -tic can be transcribed to either チック -chikku or ティック -tikku. However, -ty is almost always transcribed to ティ(ー) -ti(i), not *チ(ー) *-chi(i) (e.g. パーティー pātī "party", インフィニティ infiniti "infinity").

The English schwa /ə/ is variously "transcribed" to a, e, o, depending on the English spelling (this is more of transliteration than it is transcription). For example, デュアル dyu-a-ru "dual", デュエル dyu-e-ru "duel", テスタメント Te-su-ta-me-n-to "Testament", ロンドン Ro-n-do-n "London". There are no definite rules when it comes to the schwa, however; e.g. ランダム ra-n-da-mu "random", オープン o-o-pu-n "open", ザ za "the". The British /ə/ which is equivalent to the North American /ɚ/ is transcribed to a(-a); e.g. コンピュータ(ー) ko-n-pyu-u-ta(-a) "computer", モーター mo-o-ta-a "motor". On the other hand, the French schwa is transcribed to u or o (e.g. ソムリエ so-mu-ri-e "sommelier", ド do "de") similarly to instances where there's a lack of vowels, and the German schwa is almost always transcribed to e (e.g. アルベルト A-ru-be-ru-to "Albert", ウンディーネ un-di-i-ne "undine").

Although the diphthong /au/ across languages is usually transcribed as アウ a-u, local reading transcriptions of the same sequence from Mandarin, represented in both Wade–Giles and Pinyin as ao are represented as アオ a-o instead, again in more of a manner of transliteration based on these systems - e.g. マオ・ツォートン ma-o tso-o-to-n (Mao Zedong).

The English /æ/ is typically transcribed to a; e.g. マン ma-n "man", チャネル cha-ne-ru "channel". The sequences /kæ/ and /ɡæ/ are sometimes transcribed to kya and gya respectively; e.g. キャンディ kyandi "candy", ギャラクシー gya-ra-ku-shi-i "galaxy".

The older English suffix -age /-ɪdʒ/ is always transcribed to -e-e-ji as if it were pronounced as /eɪdʒ/ as in "age" or "rage"; e.g. メッセージ me-s-se-e-ji "message", パッケージ pa-k-ke-e-ji "package". The more recent -age /-ɑːʒ/ is more "properly" transcribed to -a-a-ju; e.g. ミラージュ mi-ra-a-ju "mirage". However, "garage" /gəˈrɑːʒ/ is more commonly transcribed to ガレージ ga-re-e-ji as it also has /ˈgærɪdʒ/ as an alternative pronunciation in British English.

The phoneme /v/ in various languages is transcribed either to b or v, although it is unknown whether there is such an equivalent phoneme /v/ in Japanese. For example, ベネチア Benechia / ヴェネツィア Ve-ne-tsi-a "Venezia" (Italian for "Venice"), オーバー o-o-ba-a "over", ラブ ra-bu / ラヴ ravu "love".

The German /v/ (orthographically w) can be transcribed in several ways. In long-established words, it is generally w. E.g.: Walküre "valkyrie" > ワルキューレ wa-ru-kyu-u-re. In newer transcriptions, it can also be v. E.g.: Schwestern "sisters" > シュヴェスタン shu-ve-su-tan.

Wa is usually written as ワ, although ウァ is sometimes used in transcriptions from Ancient Greek or Latin (e.g. ミネルウァ Mi-ne-ru-wa "Minerva").

French vowels are usually phonemically transcribed, but non-phonemic stressed vowels (utterance-final) are sometimes also transcribed as long vowels. Compare the examples of メゾン me-zo-n "maison" and カレー ka-re-e "Calais", in which the same vowel /ɛ/ is transcribed as e and e-e depending on whether it is stressed or not. The French schwa is ignored altogether: words are usually transcribed as if there were no schwa at all. For example, the word "le" is transcribed as ル ru, as is the single sound /l/ in "cheval" > シュヴァル shuvaru.

Although a syllable-final /n/ is typically transcribed using the moraic ン n, ン is used in French to transcribe nasalized vowels, so French words with a final /n/ often use ヌ nu instead for distinction, e.g. マドレーヌ Ma-do-re-e-nu "Madeleine". This is especially the case when the masculine and feminine of a word are distinct in French, e.g. bon --> ボン bo-n, vs. bonne --> ボンヌ bo-n-nu (the n is sometimes doubled, especially when the French orthography uses two n, even if it has no consequence in the French pronunciation).

Plain short consonants may be transcribed as geminated consonants to reflect the laxness of the preceding vowel, although this is not universal and there are plenty of exceptions. For example: English kick is キック ki-k-ku and castle is キャッスル kya-s-su-ru, but extra is エクストラ e-ku-su-to-ra and battle is バトル ba-to-ru. This practice expands to almost all English obstruents regardless of their voicing (/k/, /ɡ/, /s/, /z/, /f/, etc.), also to German/Scots /x/, occasionally to /n/ and /m/ (as pseudo-geminated consonant sequences /nn/ or /nm/). For example: English bag is バ(ッ)グ ba-(g)-gu; English Anna is アンナ A-n-na; English gamma is ガンマ ga-n-ma; English shuffle is シャッフル sha-f-fu-ru; German Mach is マッハ ma-h-ha, Masoch is マゾッホ Ma-zo-h-ho.

German [x] is transcribed roughly as h-h, accordingly to its preceding vowel, if it's not followed by a vowel (e.g. マッハ ma-h-ha "Mach", バッハ Ba-h-ha "Bach", マゾッホ Ma-zo-h-ho "Masoch"); [ç], its allophone occurring only after high vowels and consonants, are as h if followed by a vowel (e.g. メルヘン me-ru-hen "Märchen"), or as hi if not (e.g. リヒター Ri-hi-ta-a "Richter"). Russian /x/ is transcribed as fu if not followed by a vowel (e.g. カザフスタン Ka-za-fu-su-ta-n "Kazakhstan"). Mandarin [ɕ] (in pinyin x(i)) is transcribed as sh (e.g. シャオ shao from 小 xiǎo "little").

Geminated consonants are typically transcribed consistently and faithfully, as gemination is also featured in Japanese. The only notable exceptions are /rr/ and /ɲɲ/, although /ll/ and /ʎʎ/ are still transcribed. Examples:  is アッラーフ A-r-ra-a-fu; Italian Donatello is ドナテッロ Do-na-te-r-ro; Italian degli is デッリ de-r-ri; but Italian Verrocchio is simply ヴェロッキオ Ve-ro-k-ki-o, not *Ve-r-ro-k-ki-o. Italian /ɲɲ/ may be transcribed as the lengthened portion of the preceding vowel and a sequence of /nj/. For example, Sardegna is サルデーニャ Sa-ru-de-e-nya.

Similar to the way speakers of English say Italian words, Japanese does not usually transcribe the Italian glide /j/ to reflect its true nature, but as /i/, perhaps for consistency and convenience. For example, Venezia is ヴェネツィア Ve-ne-tsi-a, Sicilia is シチリア Shi-chi-ri-a. Contemporary transcriptions of palatalized consonants from Slavic languages, however, are made using yōon, e.g.: Russian ピャチゴルスク Pya-chi-go-ru-su-ku (Pyatigorsk), Polish ビェルスコ＝ビャワ Bye-ru-su-ko=bya-wa (Bielsko-Biała).

Modern English compounds are usually transcribed in a way that reflects the independent pronunciations of the individual components. That is to say, there is no phonetic linking between components. For example, "overall" is transcribed as オーバーオール o-o-ba-a-o-o-ru, not *o-o-ba-a-ro-o-ru as it is pronounced in English. However, there are a few exceptions, such as "pineapple", which is transcribed as パイナップル pa-i-na-p-pu-ru, or "double-u", as ダブリュー da-bu-ryu-u.

Long vowels
Long vowels are generally written with ー to indicate lengthening, as in コーラ kōra (cola), rather than writing a distinct vowel ×コウラ *koura. There are two irregularities of note here. Firstly, lengthening of the final vowel may be ambiguous, and vary over time or between users. For example, in present Japan, "computer" is generally represented as コンピューター konpyūtā (long final), but in some cases, such as the computer industry, following Japanese Industrial Standards, it is represented as コンピュータ konpyūta (short final). Secondly, in modern Chinese loanwords, notably food names, in careful transcription diphthongs are represented by separate vowels, even if in Japanese they would appear to be a long vowel; this is particularly common with òu, especially in 豆 dòu "(soy) bean", usually rendered as トウ. Further, long vowels in the Japanese transcription need not reflect Chinese pronunciation. For example, the dish 東坡肉 "Dongpo pork", in pinyin dōngpōròu (dōng·pō·ròu), is represented in Japanese as ドンポーロウ donpōrou, or more commonly トンポーロウ tonpōrou. Note that in Chinese pinyin ō represents a high tone, while in Japanese ō represents a long vowel, and /d/ is pronounced differently (Chinese /d/ is similar to Japanese or English /t/). This distinction is not always followed, and varies by term: the spelling トンポーロー tonpōrō is also common; and in terms such as 回鍋肉 twice cooked pork, the spelling ホイコーロー is more common, despite representing diphthongs.

Extended katakana
In modern times, an extended katakana system has developed to cater for foreign sounds not present in Japanese. Most of these novel katakana forms are digraphs, composed of standard katakana characters, but in digraph combinations not found in native words. For example, the word photo is transcribed as フォト (fo-to), where the novel digraph フォ (fo) is made up from フ (normally fu) plus a novel small combining form of オ (normally o). In other cases novel diacritics may be applied to create new sounds, such as ヴ for vu, which consists of ウ (u) combined with a dakuten to indicate a voiced pronunciation.

Interpunct
When it is assumed that the reader knows the separate gairaigo words in the phrase, the middle dot is omitted, especially for wasei eigo. For example, the phrase  konpyūtā gēmu ("computer game") contains two well-known gairaigo, and therefore is not written with a middle dot; the same principle is applied for  panti sutokkingu ("pantyhose", lit. "panty stocking"), Japanese coinage.

Katakana tables
The following tables give the Hepburn romanization and an approximate IPA transcription for katakana as used in contemporary Japanese. Their use in transcription is, of course, in the inverse direction.

Standard katakana

Extended katakana
The following katakana  have been developed or proposed specifically for the purposes of transcribing foreign words. Examples such as トゥ(tu) in カートゥーン(cartoon), ティ(ti) in パーティ(party), ツァ (tsa) in モーツァルト(Mozart) are found mostly in foreign words.

Table of transcription from English
{| class="wikitable"
|-
! scope="col" colspan=2 | English phonemes
! scope="col" rowspan=2 | Common English graphemes
! scope="col" colspan=3 | Japanese transcription in modified Hepburn romanization
! scope="col" rowspan=2 | Examples
|-
! scope="col" | Received Pronunciation
! scope="col" | General American
! scope="col" | If the English consonant is prevocalic and not postvocalic
! scope="col" | If the English consonant is intervocalic
! scope="col" | If the English consonant is not prevocalic
|-
| colspan=2| 
| ⟨a⟩; ⟨ae⟩; ⟨al⟩; ⟨au⟩
| colspan=3|a; ā
|ハンド hando "hand"; ラム ramu "ram", "RAM"; サモン samon, サーモン sāmon "salmon"Exception: エンド endo "and"
|-
|; 
|; 
|⟨a⟩; ⟨ach⟩; ⟨au⟩; ⟨o⟩; ⟨ou⟩
|colspan=3|o; a; ō
|ノック nokku "knock"; ショップ shoppu "shop"; オラクル orakuru "oracle"; ウォリアー woriā, ウォーリアー wōriā "warrior"; ウォッチ wotchi "watch"; ヨット yotto "yacht"; ツモロー tsumorō, トゥモロー tumorō "tomorrow"; コロンビア Koronbia "Colombia"; サッカー sakkā "soccer"; カレッジ karejji "college"; カクテル kakuteru "cocktail"; カリフラワー karifurawā "cauliflower"; バレーボール barēbōru "volleyball"; ライノセラス rainoserasu "rhinoceros"; ドール dōru "doll"; ウォーター wōtā "water"; ゴーグル gōguru "goggle"; トーマス Tōmasu "Thomas"
|-
|
|; 
|⟨a⟩; ⟨al⟩; ⟨au⟩
|colspan=3|ā, a
|アーント ānto "aunt"; ハーフ hāfu "half"; バス basu "bath"; ファスト fasuto, ファースト fāsuto "fast"; シカゴ Shikago "Chicago"; ダンス dansu "dance"
|-
|
|
|⟨ar⟩; ⟨ear⟩; ⟨er⟩
|
|ār; a
|ā
|カー kā "car"; マーカー mākā "marker"; ハート hāto "heart"; サージェント sājento "sergeant"; マーマレード māmarēdo, ママレード mamarēdo "marmalade"
|-
|colspan=2|
|⟨ai⟩; ⟨ei⟩; ⟨eigh⟩; ⟨i⟩; ⟨ic⟩; ⟨ie⟩; ⟨igh⟩; ⟨is⟩; ⟨oy⟩; ⟨uy⟩; ⟨y⟩; ⟨ye⟩
|colspan=3|ai
|ハイ hai "high", "hi"; ライト raito "right", "light"; ガイ gai "guy"; ガイド gaido "guide"; スタイル sutairu "style"; ハイト haito "height"
|-
|
|; 
|⟨ia(r)⟩; ⟨igher⟩; ⟨ire⟩; ⟨iro⟩
|
|aiar; aiyar
|aia; aiā; aiya; aiyā
|ファイアー faiā, ファイヤー faiyā "fire"; アイアン aian "iron"; ダイアリー daiarī, ダイヤリー daiyarī "diary"; ダイヤモンド daiyamondo "diamond"Exceptions: アイルランド Airurando "Ireland"; アイロン airon "iron"
|-
|
|
|⟨ile⟩
|colspan=2|
|airu, uru, oru
|ミサイル misairu "missile"; レプタイル reputairu, レプトル reputoru "reptile"
|-
|colspan=2|
|⟨au⟩; ⟨ou⟩; ⟨ough⟩; ⟨ow⟩
|colspan=3|au; a
|タウン taun "town"; ダウン daun "down"; プラウ purau "plough", "plow"; ファウンデーション faundēshon, ファンデーション fandēshon "foundation"
|-
|
|
|⟨our⟩; ⟨ower⟩
|
|awār
|awā
|パワー pawā "power"; アワー awā "our", "hour"
|-
|colspan=2|
|⟨b⟩; ⟨bb⟩; ⟨be⟩; ⟨pb⟩
|b
|b; bb
|bu; bbu
|ベンチ benchi "bench"; バッブル babburu "bubble"; ラブ rabu "lab"; ブラザー burazā "brother"; ブレイク Bureiku "Blake"Exception: カップボード kappubōdo "cupboard"
|-
|colspan=2|
|⟨d⟩; ⟨dd⟩; ⟨de⟩
|d
|d; dd; j
|do; ddo; zu; zzu; tto
|デス desu "death"; ベッド beddo "bed"; サンデー Sandē "Sunday"; ドゥーム dūmu "doom"; ドラゴン doragon "dragon"; キッド kiddo, キッズ kizzu "kid"; リドラー Ridorā "Riddler"; ゼット zetto "zed"; アンデッド andeddo, アンデット andetto "undead"; エジソン Ejison, エディソン Edison, エディスン Edisun "Edison"; クレジット kurejitto "credit"
|-
|
|
|⟨dew⟩; ⟨du⟩; ⟨due⟩
|dyū; dyu
|colspan=2|
|デューク dyūku "duke"; デュアル dyuaru "dual"; デュエル dyueru "duel"; デュー dyū "dew", "due"; エデュケーション edyukēshon "education"
|-
|colspan=2|
|⟨ds⟩; ⟨dds⟩
|colspan=2|
|zu; zzu
|エイズ eizu "AIDS"; キッズ kizzu "kids"; グッズ guzzu "goods"
|-
|colspan=2|
|⟨di⟩; ⟨dg⟩; ⟨dge⟩; ⟨g⟩; ⟨ge⟩; ⟨j⟩
|j
|j; jj; z
|ji; jji; tsu
|ジャンプ janpu "jump"; エッジ ejji "edge"; ジェリー Jerī "Gerry", "Jerry"; バジェット bajetto "budget"; ガレージ garēji "garage"; ソルジャー sorujā "soldier"; エンジェル enjeru, エンゼル enzeru "angel"; ジェミナイ, ヂェミナイ Jeminai "Gemini"; キャベツ kyabetsu "cabbage"
|-
|colspan=2|
|⟨th⟩; ⟨the⟩
|colspan=2|z; j
|zu
|ザ za, ジー jī "the"; マザー mazā "mother"; アルゴリズム arugorizumu "algorithm"
|-
|colspan=2|
|⟨ae⟩; ⟨e⟩; ⟨ea⟩; ⟨ie⟩; ⟨oe⟩
|colspan=3|e
|エンド endo "end"; ヘッド heddo "head"; フレンド furendo "friend"Exception: セーター sētā "sweater"
|-
|
|
|⟨ar⟩; ⟨air⟩; ⟨are⟩; ⟨ear⟩; ⟨eir⟩; ⟨ere⟩; ⟨ey're⟩
|
|ear; er
|ea; eā
|エア ea, エアー eā "air"; シェア shea "share"; ベア bea "bear"; エリア eria "area"Exception: プレーリー purērī "prairie"
|-
|colspan=2 rowspan=3|
|⟨a⟩
|colspan=3|a
|アーカンソー Ākansō "Arkansas"; イングランド Ingurando "England"; マリガン marigan "mulligan"; アバウト abauto "about"; コンマ konma "comma"Exception: プレデター puredetā "predator"
|-
|⟨o⟩
|colspan=3|o; u; a
|コモン komon "common"; オブ obu "of"; ツデー tsudē, トゥデー tudē "today"; ダイナソー dainasō, ダイノソー dainosō "dinosaur"; セカンド sekando "second"
|-
|⟨gh⟩; ⟨ou⟩; ⟨ough⟩; ⟨u⟩
|colspan=3|a
|サラ sara "thorough"; バラ bara "borough"; エディンバラ Edinbara "Edinburgh"; アルバカーキ Arubakāki "Albuquerque"; ニューファンドランド Nyūfandorando "Newfoundland"
|-
|rowspan=2|
|rowspan=2|
|⟨ar⟩; ⟨er⟩; ⟨ure⟩
|
|ar
|a; ā
|ハンガー hangā "hanger", "hangar"; コンピュータ konpyūta, コンピューター konpyūtā "computer"; ロバート Robāto "Robert"; フューチャー fyūchā "future"; ノーザン nōzan "northern"; プロパティ puropati "property"; ハンカチーフ hankachīfu "handkerchief"
|-
|⟨or⟩; ⟨our⟩
|
|ar
|ā; oru
|モーター mōtā "motor"; カラー karā "colour"; カーソル kāsoru "cursor"; メルボルン Meruborun "Melbourne"
|-
|
|
|⟨oard⟩; ⟨ord⟩
|colspan=3|ōdo
|オックスフォード Okkusufōdo "Oxford"
|-
|colspan=2 rowspan=2|; 
|⟨al⟩
|colspan=2|
|aru
|プロポーザル puropōzaru "proposal"; ライバル raibaru "rival"; タイダル taidaru "tidal"; オフィシャル ofisharu "official"
|-
|⟨ael⟩; ⟨el⟩; ⟨le⟩
|colspan=2|
|uru; oru; eru
|ベーグル bēguru "bagel"; マッスル massuru "muscle"; テーブル tēburu "table"; サイクル saikuru "cycle"; ミドル midoru "middle"; ステープル sutēpuru "staple"; ケトル ketoru "kettle"; パズル pazuru "puzzle"; パネル paneru "panel"; レベル reberu, レヴェル reveru "level", "revel", "rebel"; マイケル Maikeru "Michael"
|-
|colspan=2 rowspan=2|
|⟨am⟩; ⟨em⟩; ⟨om⟩; ⟨ome⟩
|colspan=2|
|amu
|キングダム kingudamu "kingdom"; ランダム randamu "random"; セイラム Seiramu "Salem"; ゴッサム Gossamu "Gotham"; オーサム ōsamu "awesome"
|-
|⟨um⟩
|colspan=2|
|amu; umu
|アルバム arubamu "album"; オポッサム opossamu "opossum"; デューテリウム dyūteriumu "deuterium"; バキューム bakyūmu "vacuum"
|-
|colspan=2|; 
|⟨ain⟩; ⟨en⟩; ⟨on⟩
|colspan=2|
|un; on; en
|ハイフン haifun "hyphen"; セブン sebun "seven"; フォールン fōrun "fallen"; オープン ōpun "open"; トークン tōkun "token"; リーズン rīzun "reason"; シーズン shīzun "season"; プリズン purizun "prison"; レッスン ressun "lesson"; セコンド sekondo "second"; サドン sadon "sudden"; スウェーデン Suwēden "Sweden"; マウンテン maunten "mountain"; ブリテン Buriten "Britain"; テスタメント tesutamento "testament"; ヘレン Heren "Hellen"Exception: クライアント kuraianto "client"; セカンド sekando "second"
|-
|colspan=2|
|⟨us⟩
|colspan=2|
|asu
|バイラス bairasu, ヴァイラス vairasu "virus"; コーカス Kōkasasu "Caucasus"
|-
|
|
|⟨au⟩; ⟨eau⟩; ⟨eaux⟩; ⟨o⟩; ⟨oa⟩; ⟨oe⟩; ⟨oh⟩; ⟨ough⟩; ⟨ow⟩; ⟨owe⟩
|colspan=3|ō; ou; o
|ゴー gō "go"; ショー shō "show"; シャドー shadō, シャドウ shadou "shadow"; ホーム hōmu "home"; ソウル souru "soul"; オハイオ Ohaio "Ohio"; ポニー ponī "pony"
|-
|
|
|⟨ear⟩; ⟨er⟩; ⟨ir⟩; ⟨olo⟩; ⟨ur⟩
|
|ār
|ā; a
|アース āsu "earth"; スターリング Sutāringu "Sterling", "Stirling"; バーチャル bācharu "virtual"; カーブ kābu "curve", "curb"; カーネル kāneru "colonel", "kernel"; シャツ shatsu "shirt"; オルタナティブ orutanatibu "alternative"; ファーリー fārī "furry"
|-
|colspan=2|
|⟨a⟩; ⟨ae⟩; ⟨ai⟩; ⟨ais⟩; ⟨ait⟩; ⟨al⟩; ⟨au⟩; ⟨ay⟩; ⟨e⟩; ⟨ei⟩; ⟨eigh⟩; ⟨et⟩; ⟨ey⟩
|colspan=3|ē; ei; e
|ネーム nēmu "name"; ゲージ gēji "gauge"; ドレイク doreiku "drake"; エイト eito "eight"; レイフ Reifu "Ralph"; ポテト poteto "potato"; エンジェル enjeru "angel"; エンシェント enshento "ancient"; ブレザー burezā "blazer"; エプロン epuron "apron"; レディ redi, レディー redī "lady"; ベビー bebī "baby"Exceptions: オーストラリア Ōsutoraria "Australia"; カナディアン Kanadian "Canadian"; ラジオ rajio "radio"; スタジアム sutajiamu "stadium"
|-
|colspan=2|
|⟨f⟩; ⟨fe⟩; ⟨ff⟩; ⟨gh⟩; ⟨ph⟩; ⟨u⟩
|f; h
|f; ff
|fu; ffu
|ファウル fauru "foul"; フライ furai "fry", "fly"; フラワー furawā "flower"; シャッフル shaffuru "shuffle"; ラフ rafu "rough"; ヘッドホン heddohon "headphone"; レフテナント refutenanto "lieutenant"
|-
|colspan=2|
|⟨g⟩; ⟨gg⟩; ⟨gh⟩; ⟨gu⟩; ⟨gue⟩
|g
|g; gg
|gu; ggu
|ガン gan "gun"; バッグ baggu "bag"; グラインダー guraindā "grinder"; グルー gurū "glue"; マグル Maguru "Muggle"; グール gūru "ghoul"; ギター gitā "guitar"
|-
|colspan=2|
|⟨ga⟩
|ga; gya
|colspan=2|
|ガジェット gajetto "gadget"; ギャラクシー gyarakushī "galaxy"; ギャル gyaru "gal"
|-
|colspan=2|
|⟨gs⟩; ⟨ggs⟩; ⟨x⟩; ⟨xh⟩
|
|guz; guj; kiz; kuz
|guzu; gguzu
|エグジット egujitto "exit"; エグゾーダス eguzōdasu "exodus"; エグザミネーション eguzaminēshon "examination"; エキゾチック ekizochikku "exotic"; エキゾースト ekizōsuto "exhaust"; バッグズ bagguzu "bags"
|-
|
|
|⟨xu⟩; ⟨xhu⟩
|
|gujū
|
|エグジューム egujūmu "exhume"
|-
|colspan=2|
|⟨gh⟩; ⟨h⟩
|h
|colspan=2|
|ハンター hantā "hunter"; ハッブル Habburu "Hubble"
|-
|colspan=2|; 
|⟨hoo⟩; ⟨who⟩
|colspan=2|fū
|
|フー fū "who"; フッド fuddo, フード fūdo "hood"; フック fukku, ホック hokku "hook"
|-
|colspan=2|
|⟨a⟩; ⟨ae⟩; ⟨e⟩; ⟨ei⟩; ⟨i⟩; ⟨ie⟩; ⟨oe⟩
|colspan=3|i; ī; e; ē
|インプット inputto "input"; リミテッド rimiteddo "limited"; ネイキッド neikiddo "naked"; トイレット toiretto "toilet"; オレンジ orenji "orange"; ステッカー sutekkā "sticker"; デステニー desutenī "destiny"; デジタル dejitaru "digital"; アイデア aidea "idea"; メッセージ messēji "message"; ガレージ garēji "garage"; ダメージ damēji "damage"; カレッジ karejji "college"; チョコレート chokorēto "chocolate"; パレス paresu "palace"; アルティメット arutimetto "ultimate"; ネッカチーフ nekkachīfu "neckerchief"
|-
|
|
|⟨aer⟩; ⟨e're⟩; ⟨ear⟩; ⟨eer⟩; ⟨er⟩; ⟨ere⟩; ⟨ier⟩; ⟨ir⟩
|
|iar; iyar; īr; ir; ear
|ia; iya; īa; ea
|ギア gia "gear"; ミーアキャット mīakyatto "meerkat"; イヤホン iyahon "earphone"; ヒーロー hīrō "hero"; ヒロイン hiroin "heroine"; ステアリング sutearingu "steering"
|-
|colspan=2 rowspan=2|
|⟨e⟩; ⟨ea⟩; ⟨ee⟩; ⟨ei⟩; ⟨y⟩
|colspan=3|i; ī; yi; ē
|コミッティー komittī "committee"; ヤンキー Yankī "Yankee"; シティー shiti "city"; コメディ komedi, コメディー komedī "comedy"; アポストロフィ aposutorofi "apostrophe"; ハッピー happī, ハッピィ happyi "happy"; キャンディ kyandi, キャンディー kyandī, キャンデー kyandē "candy"
|-
|⟨ay⟩; ⟨ey⟩
|colspan=3|ī; ē; ei; e
|マリー Marī, マーレイ Mārei "Murray"; リンジー Rinjī "Lindsay"; ハービー Hābī "Harvey"; ハーレー Hārē "Harley"; ラムゼイ Ramuzei "Ramsay"; ハネムーン hanemūn, ハニームーン hanīmūn "honeymoon"
|-
|colspan=2|
|⟨ae⟩; ⟨e⟩; ⟨ea⟩; ⟨ee⟩; ⟨i⟩; ⟨ie⟩; ⟨oe⟩
|colspan=3|ī; ē; e
|チーム chīmu "team"; グリーン gurīn "green"; ピース pīsu "piece", "peace"; タキシード takishīdo "tuxedo"; デーモン dēmon "demon"; ノルウェージャン Noruwējan "Norwegian"; ハイエナ haiena "hyena"; フェニックス fenikkusu "phoenix"
|-
|colspan=2|
|⟨y⟩
|y; i
|colspan=2|
|ヤング yangu "young"; ヨーク Yōku "York"; イェール Yēru "Yale"; イエロー ierō, イエロウ ierou "yellow"; イエス iesu "yes"
|-
|; 
|; 
|⟨eu⟩; ⟨u⟩; ⟨you⟩; ⟨yu⟩; ⟨ut⟩
|colspan=2|yū; yu
|
|ユー yū "you", "U"; ユニオン yunion "union"; ダブリュー daburyū "W"; サミュエル Samyueru "Samuel"; フォーミュラ fōmyura "formula"
|-
|; 
|; 
|⟨eu(r)⟩; ⟨u(r)⟩; ⟨you(r)⟩; ⟨you're⟩; ⟨yu(r)⟩; ⟨uh(r)⟩
|
|yūr; yur; yuar
|yua
|ユーロ yūro "euro"; ユア yua "your", "you're"; マーキュリー Mākyurī "Mercury"
|-
|colspan=2|
|⟨c⟩; ⟨cc⟩; ⟨ch⟩; ⟨che⟩; ⟨ck⟩; ⟨k⟩; ⟨ke⟩; ⟨kh⟩; ⟨qu⟩; ⟨que⟩
|k
|k; kk
|ku; kku; ki; kki
|カップ kappu "cup"; キック kikku "kick"; テイク teiku "take"; ストライキ sutoraiki "strike"; ケーキ kēki "cake"; ステーキ sutēki "steak"; デッキ dekki "deck"; クラウン kuraun "clown"; サッカー sakkā "soccer", "sucker"; クロニクル kuronikuru "chronicle"
|-
|colspan=2|
|⟨ca⟩; ⟨cha⟩; ⟨ka⟩
|ka; kya
|colspan=2|
|カンザス Kanzasu "Kansas"; カメラ kamera "camera"; キャメロン Kyameron "Cameron"; キャンディー kyandī "candy"; キャプテン kyaputen "captain"
|-
|colspan=2|
|⟨cc⟩; ⟨cs⟩; ⟨chs⟩; ⟨cks⟩; ⟨ks⟩; ⟨khs⟩; ⟨x⟩; ⟨xe⟩
|
|kus; kkus; kis; kish
|kkusu; kisu
|メキシコ Mekishiko "Mexico"; テキサス Tekisasu "Texas"; テキスト tekisuto "text"; プロキシ purokishi "proxy"; タキシード takishīdo "tuxedo"; シックス shikkusu "six", "sicks"; コンプレックス konpurekkusu "complex"
|-
|colspan=2|
|⟨cti⟩; ⟨xi⟩
|
|kush
|
|コネクション konekushon "connection", "connexion"
|-
|colspan=2|
|⟨xual⟩
|
|kusharu; kushuaru
|
|バイセクシャル baisekusharu, バイセクシュアル baisekushuaru "bisexual"
|-
|colspan=2|
|⟨cho⟩; ⟨cqu⟩; ⟨qu⟩
|colspan=2|ku; kuw; kw; k
|
|クオーク kuōku, クォーク kwōku "quark"; クイーン kuīn, クィーン kwīn "queen"; クワイア kuwaia "choir"; スコール sukōru "squall"; ターコイズ tākoizu "turquoise"
|-
|colspan=2|
|⟨l⟩; ⟨le⟩; ⟨ll⟩
|r
|r
|ru
|ループ rūpu "loop"; ボール bōru "ball"; ブリー burī "bully"
|-
|colspan=2|
|⟨m⟩; ⟨mb⟩; ⟨me⟩; ⟨mm⟩; ⟨mn⟩
|m
|m; nm
|mu; n
|メイ Mei "May"; サモン samon "summon"; ゲーム gēmu "game"; ランプ ranpu "lamp", "lump", "ramp", "rump"; ナンバー nanbā "number"; ガンマ ganma "gamma"; ボム bomu "bomb"; オータム ōtamu "autumn"
|-
|colspan=2|
|⟨n⟩; ⟨nd⟩; ⟨ne⟩; ⟨nn⟩
|n
|n; nn
|n; nu
|ナイン nain "nine"; ファン fan "fan"; バナナ banana "banana"; アンナ Anna "Anna"; エヌ enu "N"; カンニング kanningu "cunning"; ハンサム hansamu "handsome"; ハンカチーフ hankachīfu "handkerchief"
|-
|
|
|⟨new⟩; ⟨neu⟩; ⟨nu⟩
|colspan=3|nyū
|ニュー nyū "new"; ニュートロン nyūtoron "neutron"
|-
|
|
|⟨newr⟩; ⟨neur⟩; ⟨nur⟩; ⟨nure⟩
|
|nyūr
|
|ニューロン nyūron "neuron"
|-
|colspan=2|; 
|⟨n⟩; ⟨ng⟩
|
|ng
|n; ngu
|シンガー singā "singer"; フィンガー fingā "finger"; リンク rinku "link"; リング ringu "ring"; バーミンガム Bāmingamu, バーミングハム Bāminguhamu "Birmingham"; チューインガム chūin gamu "chewing gum"; ワシントン Washinton "Washington"; ブーメラン būmeran "boomerang"
|-
|colspan=2|
|⟨al⟩; ⟨au⟩; ⟨aw⟩; ⟨oa⟩; ⟨ough⟩
|colspan=3|ō; ou; o
|トーク tōku "talk"; オーストラリア Ōsutoria "Austria"; クロー kurō, クロウ kurou "claw", "craw"; ストロー sutorō "straw"; ストロベリー sutoroberī "strawberry"
|-
|colspan=2|
|⟨al⟩; ⟨aul⟩; ⟨awl⟩
|
|ōr
|ōru; oru; aru
|クローラー kuōrā "crawler"; オルタナティブ orutanatibu "alternative"; ワルツ warutsu "waltz"; アサルト asaruto "assault"
|-
|rowspan=2|
|rowspan=2|
|⟨ar⟩; ⟨aur⟩; ⟨oar⟩; ⟨or⟩; ⟨our⟩; ⟨wor⟩
|colspan=2|
|ō(r); oru; oa; ā
|ボード bōdo "board"; コース kōsu "course"; フォー fō "four"; ストーム sutōmu "storm"; トルネード torunēdo "tornado"; ボーテックス bōtekkusu, ボルテックス borutekkusu "vortex"; ノルウェー Noruwē "Norway"; ウォー wō "war"; オア oa "or", "oar"; ダイナソー dainasō, ダイノソー dainosō "dinosaur"; コーラス kōrasu "chorus"; ソード sōdo "sword"; ワープ wāpu "warp"; ホグワーツ Hoguwātsu "Hogwarts"
|-
|⟨oor⟩; ⟨ore⟩
|colspan=2|
|oa
|コア koa "core"; フォア foa "fore"; ドア doa "door"; フロア furoa "floor"
|-
|colspan=2|
|⟨eu⟩; ⟨oi⟩; ⟨oy⟩
|colspan=3|oi
|コイン koin "coin"; トイ toi "toy"Exception: ボーイ bōi "boy"
|-
|colspan=2|
|⟨awyer⟩
|colspan=3|oiyā
|ロイヤー roiyā "lawyer"
|-
|colspan=2|
|⟨oyal⟩
|colspan=3|oiyaru
|ロイヤル roiyaru "royal", "loyal"
|-
|colspan=2|
|⟨p⟩; ⟨pe⟩; ⟨ph⟩; ⟨pp⟩
|p
|p; pp
|pu; ppu
|パック pakku "pack"; トップ toppu "top"; プランクトン purankuton "plankton"; プルーフ purūfu "proof"
|-
|; 
|
|⟨lo⟩; ⟨r⟩; ⟨re⟩; ⟨rh⟩; ⟨rps⟩; ⟨rr⟩; ⟨rt⟩
|r
|r
|omitted; ru
|ラム ramu "ram", "RAM", "rum"; テリー Terī "Terry"; リズム rizumu "rhythm"; バー bā "bar"; カリフォルニア Kariforunia "California"; アール āru "R", "are"
|-
|colspan=2|
|⟨rei⟩
|colspan=3|rii; ryi; ri
|リインカーネーション riinkānēshon , リィンカーネーション ryinkānēshon, リンカーネーション rinkānēshon, リンカーネイション rinkāneishon, リンカネーション rinkanēshon "reincarnation"
|-
|colspan=2|
|⟨'s⟩; ⟨c⟩; ⟨ce⟩; ⟨s⟩; ⟨s'⟩; ⟨sc⟩; ⟨se⟩; ⟨ss⟩; ⟨st⟩; ⟨sw⟩
|s; sh
|s; ss; sh; ssh
|su; ssu
|サンド sando "sand"; シンク shinku "sink", "cinque"; メッセンジャー messenjā "messenger"; ケーシング kēshingu "casing"; キス kisu, キッス kissu "kiss"; キャッスル kyassuru "castle"; ストップ sutoppu "stop"; スラッシュ surasshu "slash"; セント sento "cent"; マッスル massuru "muscle"; クリスマス Kurisumasu "Christmas"Exception: シチュー shichū "stew"
|-
|
|
|⟨su⟩
|colspan=2|shū
|
|コンシューマー konshūmā "consumer"
|-
|colspan=2|
|⟨ch⟩; ⟨che⟩; ⟨ci⟩; ⟨s⟩; ⟨sc⟩; ⟨sch⟩; ⟨sh⟩; ⟨si⟩; ⟨sti⟩; ⟨ti⟩
|sh
|sh; ssh
|shu; sshu
|シップ shippu "ship"; クラッシャー kurasshā "crusher"; フラッシュ furasshu "flash", "flush"; シュラウド shuraudo "shroud"; ディメンション dimenshon "dimension"; アクション akushon "action"; イグニッション igunisshon "ignition"; スペシャル supesharu "special"
|-
|colspan=2|
|⟨sual⟩
|colspan=2|sharu; shuaru
|
|コンセンシャル konsensharu "consensual"
|-
|colspan=2|
|⟨bt⟩; ⟨ct⟩; ⟨pt⟩; ⟨t⟩; ⟨te⟩; ⟨th⟩; ⟨tt⟩; ⟨tte⟩
|t; ch; ts
|t; tt; ts
|to; tto; tsu; ttsu; do
|テープ tēpu "tape"; インフィニティ infiniti "infinity"; チップ chippu "tip"; チーム chīmu "team"; スチーム suchīmu "steam"; チケット chiketto, ティケット tiketto, テケツ teketsu "ticket"; ツアー tsuā "tour"; ツー tsū, トゥー tū "two", "to"; タイタン Taitan "Titan"; スケート sukēto "skate"; ヒッティング hittingu "hitting"; カートゥーン kātūn "cartoon"; キャット kyatto, キャッツ kyattsu "cat"; シャツ shatsu "shirt"; ピーナッツ pīnattsu, ピーナツ pīnatsu, ピーナット pīnatto "peanut"; フルーツ furūtsu "fruit"; スーツ sūtsu, スート sūto "suit"; トランプ torampu "trump"; バトル batoru "battle"; テムズ Temuzu, テームズ Tēmuzu "Thames"; コネチカット Konechikatto "Connecticut"; アドバンスト adobansuto, アドバンスド adobansudo "advanced"
|-
|
|
|⟨tew⟩; ⟨tu⟩; ⟨tue⟩
|chū; chuw; tyū
|colspan=2|
|チューナー chūnā "tuner"; チューバ chūba, テューバ tyūba "tuba"; スチュワード suchuwādo "steward"; チューズデー Chūzudē "Tuesday"
|-
|colspan=2|
|⟨t's⟩; ⟨ts⟩; ⟨tts⟩
|colspan=2|
|tsu; ttsu
|キャッツ kyattsu "cats"; イッツ ittsu "it's", "its"
|-
|colspan=2|
|⟨ch⟩; ⟨tch⟩
|ch
|ch; tch
|chi; tchi
|チキン chikin, チケン chiken, チッケン chikken "chicken"; キチン kichin, キッチン kitchin, キッチェン kitchen "kitchen"; マッチ matchi "match"
|-
|
|
|⟨ture⟩
|
|chua
|
|マチュア machua "mature"
|-
|colspan=2|
|⟨tual⟩
|colspan=2|
|charu; chuaru
|バーチャル bācharu, バーチュアル bāchuaru "virtual"
|-
|colspan=2|
|⟨th⟩; ⟨the⟩
|s; sh
|s; ss; sh; ssh; j
|su; ssu
|ソー Sō "Thor"; シーフ shīfu "thief"; バスルーム basurūmu "bathroom"; スレッド sureddo "thread"; ゴッサム Gossamu "Gotham"; アメシスト ameshisuto, アメジスト amejisuto "amethyst"
|-
|colspan=2|
|⟨oo⟩; ⟨u⟩
|colspan=3|u
|ブック bukku "book"; ブル buru "bull"
|-
|; 
|
|⟨oor⟩; ⟨our⟩; ⟨ure⟩
|
|uar; ūr
|ua; ūa; uā
|ムーア mūa "moor"; シュア shua "sure"; ツアー tsuā "tour"; ツーリスト tsūrisuto "tourist"; ミズーリ Mizūri "Missouri"
|-
|colspan=2|
|⟨ew⟩; ⟨o⟩; ⟨oe⟩; ⟨oo⟩; ⟨ou⟩; ⟨ough⟩; ⟨ue⟩; ⟨ui⟩
|colspan=3|ū; u; yū
|ドゥー dū "do"; コクーン kokūn "cocoon"; シュー shū "shoe"; スープ sūpu "soup"; スルー surū "through"; ブルーマー burūmā, ブルマー burumā "bloomer"; ジュース jūsu "juice"; ブイ bui "buoy"; クルー kurū "crew"; コークスクリュー kōkusukuryū "corkscrew"; アンドリュー Andoryū "Andrew"Exceptions: ドリトル Doritoru "Dolittle"; スタジオ sutajio "studio"; アコースティック akōsutikku "acoustic"
|-
|colspan=2|
|⟨ph⟩; ⟨v⟩; ⟨ve⟩; ⟨w⟩
|b; v
|b; v
|bu; vu
|バイキング Baikingu, ヴァイキング Vaikingu "Viking"; ラブ rabu, ラヴ ravu "love"; スティーヴン Sutīvun "Stephen"
|-
|colspan=2|
|⟨o⟩; ⟨oo⟩; ⟨ou⟩; ⟨u⟩
|colspan=3|a; o
|マフィン mafin, マッフィン maffin "muffin"; ブラッド buraddo "blood"; プラス purasu "plus"; カミング kamingu "coming"; マンスリー mansurī "monthly"; パンチ panchi, ポンチ ponchi "punch";  コロンビア Koronbia "Columbia"; トンネル tonneru "tunnel"; フロント furonto "front"; モンク monku "monk"; モンキー monkī "monkey"; ロンドン Rondon "London"
|-
|colspan=2 rowspan=2|
|⟨w⟩; ⟨ou⟩
|u; w; omitted
|u; w
|
|グウェン Guwen "Gwen"; スウェーデン Suwēden "Sweden"; ウォーム wōmu "warm"; ワーム wāmu "worm"; ツイン tsuin "twin"; ジャガー jagā "jaguar"; ペンギン pengin "penguin"; ティンクル tinkuru "twinkle"; サンドイッチ sandoitchi, サンドウィッチ sandowitchi "sandwich"; セーター sētā "sweater"; アウェイクン aweikun, アウエイクン aueikun "awaken"
|-
|⟨wh⟩
|how; ho; u; w
|colspan=2|
|ホワイト howaito "white"; ホワッツ howattsu "what's"; ホエール hoēru "whale"; ホイール hoīru "wheel"; ホイップ hoippu, ウイップ uippu, ウィップ wippu "whip"; ウィート wīto "wheat"
|-
|colspan=2|
|⟨wo⟩; ⟨woo⟩
|u; ū
|colspan=2|
|ウッド uddo "wood"; ウーマン ūman "woman"
|-
|colspan=2|
|⟨'s⟩; ⟨s⟩; ⟨sc⟩; ⟨se⟩; ⟨ss⟩; ⟨z⟩; ⟨ze⟩; ⟨zz⟩
|z; j
|z; zz; j; jj
|zu; zzu; su
|ズーム zūmu "zoom"; ジッパー jippā "zipper"; ライジング raijingu "rising"; クレージ kurējī "crazy"; フェイズ feizu "phase"; パズル pazuru "puzzle"; ディジー dijī, ディズィー dizī "dizzy"; ポゼッション pozesshon "possession"; ミズーリ Mizūri "Missouri"; ニュース nyūsu "news"; ブルース burūsu "blues"; フェアリーズ fearīzu, フェアリース fearīsu "fairies"; ゼット zetto, ズィ zi "Z"
|-
|colspan=2|
|⟨g⟩; ⟨ge⟩; ⟨si⟩; ⟨ti⟩; ⟨zi⟩
|
|j
|
|テレビジョン terebijon "television"; イクエージョン ikuējon "equation"; ブレージャーburējā "brazier"
|-
|colspan=2|
|⟨sual⟩
|
|juaru
|
|ビジュアル bijuaru "visual"
|}

See also 
 Romanization of Japanese
 Transcription into Korean

References 

Japanese writing system
Transcription (linguistics)